Grime vs. Grandeur is the fourth album by Swedish power metal band Falconer, and the last to feature vocalist Kristoffer Göbel.

Track listing
All songs written by Stefan Weinerhall.

Credits
Kristoffer Göbel - Vocals
Stefan Weinerhall - Guitar
Jimmy Hedlund - Guitar
Magnus Linhardt - Bass
Karsten Larsson - Drums

Album notes
The digipack version features the bonus track Wake Up, which features Andy LaRocque as co-lead vocalist.
In Japan the bonus track is Rock 'n' Roll Devil.
Snowy Shaw, who did the photography for the album booklet, plays drums on track 3.
Elize Ryd, who did the backing vocals in the band's previous album, The Sceptre of Deception, did backing vocals in some songs from this album, most notably track 1.

References 

2005 albums
Falconer (band) albums
Metal Blade Records albums